Bostra illusella is a species of snout moth in the genus Bostra. It was described by Francis Walker in 1863. It is found in Sri Lanka.

References

External links
 
 

Pyralini
Moths described in 1863
Moths of Asia